Roselle (Hibiscus sabdariffa) is a species of flowering plant in the genus Hibiscus that is native to Africa, most likely West Africa and also found in India especially Maharashtra with local name ambali. In the 16th and early 17th centuries it was spread to the West Indies and Asia, respectively, where it has since become naturalized in many places. The stems are used for the production of bast fibre and the dried cranberry-tasting calyces are commonly steeped to make a popular infusion known as carcade.

Description

Names

Asia 
Roselle is known as karkadeh (كركديه) in Arabic, chin baung (ချဉ်ပေါင်) by the Burmese, luoshen hua (洛神花) in Chinese, kraceī́yb   in Thai), ສົ້ມພໍດີ /sőm phɔː diː/ in Lao, ស្លឹក​ជូរ /slɜk cuː/ សណ្តាន់​ទេស /sɑndan tẹːh/, ម្ជូរ​បារាំង /məcuː baraŋ/, or ម្ជូរ​ព្រឹក /məcuː prɨk/ in Khmer, and cây quế mầu, cây bụp giấm, or cây bụt giấm in Vietnamese.

South-East Asia including Northeastern India and Mainland South Asia 
Roselle is known as Pundi Palle / Pundi Soppu (ಪುಂಡಿ ಪಲ್ಯ / ಪುಂಡಿ ಸೊಪ್ಪು) in Kannada, Hoilfa (হইলফা) in Sylheti and Chukur (চুকুর), Amlamadhur (অম্লমধুর) in Bengali.  Also known as Tengamora (টেঙামৰা) by various indigenous ethnic groups of Assam, dachang or datchang by Atongs,  mwita among the Bodo(another native ethnicity of Assam), amile among Chakmas mostly in Chittagong, Gal•da among Garos, Hanserong among Karbi (an indigenous group of Asaam), among Lotha of Nagaland Hantserup, mathippuli (മത്തിപ്പുളി) and pulivenda (പുളിവെണ്ട) in Malayalam, ambadi (अंबाडी) in Maharashtra, okhreo among Maos, sillo sougri among Meitei, बेलचण्डा (belchanda) among Nepalese, and khata palanga (ଖଟାପାଳଙ୍ଗ) Jagatsinghpur and Cuttack districts and takabhendi (ଟକଭେଣ୍ଡି) in Odia in the Balasore district of Odisha, pulicha keerai (புளிச்சகீரை) in Tamil and gongura (గోంగూర) in Telugu. Anthur Sen(roselle red) or Lakher Anthur in Mizo, Hmiakhu Saipa(roselle red) or Matu Hmiakhu in Mara in Mizoram, India and Chin State, Myanmar.

It is called Ya Pung by the Marma people.

In the Chota Nagpur region, it is known as "Kudrum" or "Dhepa saag" in the Nagpuri/Sadri dialect. It is also known by different names in different languages of this region, like "Ipil jongor ", which means "star fruit" in the Mundari language.

Australia 
In Australia
,Roselle is known as the rosella or rosella fruit. The plant's introduction to Australia is thought to be from interactions from Makassarese traders.

Africa 
Among the Yoruba in southwest Nigeria, Roselle is known as ìsápá, and yakuwa by the Hausa people of northern Nigeria who also call the seeds as gurguzu and the capsule cover as zoborodo or zobo.

Among the Tiv Tribe of Central Nigeria, the plant is called "Ashwe" while the capsule is referred to as "Agbende Ashwe". It is primarily consumed as a soup in three forms: The leaves are either cooked, or steamed and crushed on a grinding stone, in which form it is considered a delicacy due to its preservation of the characteristic 'tang' (slightly sour taste) of the leaves. The outer covering of the capsule (green variety)  is also cooked as a soup which doesn't have the tang of the leaves. The red variant of the capsule are rarely (if ever) cooked, but instead boiled and the extract cooled and drank (like tea or soda when sugar is added). This form is known as "zobo" which is actually a borrowed name, just as this method of preparation is borrowed. Traditionally the red variant was used as a dye to color wood, and similar things.[citation needed]

Latin America and the Caribbean 
Roselle is known as saril or flor de Jamaica in Central America and sorrel in many parts of the English-speaking Caribbean, including Trinidad and Tobago, Jamaica and most of the islands in the West Indies.

Uses
In India, the plant is primarily cultivated for the production of bast fibre used in cordage, made from its stem. The fibre may be used as a substitute for jute in making burlap. Hibiscus, specifically roselle, has been used in folk medicine as a diuretic and mild laxative.

The red calyces of the plant are increasingly exported to the United States and Europe, particularly Germany, where they are used as food colourings. It can be found in markets (as flowers or syrup) in places, such as France, where there are Senegalese immigrant communities. The green leaves are used like a spicy version of spinach. They give flavour to the Senegalese fish and rice dish thieboudienne. In Myanmar their green leaves are the main ingredient in chin baung kyaw curry.

Brazilians attribute stomachic, emollient, and resolutive properties to the bitter roots.

Vegetable
In Bihar and Jharkhand roselle is also known as "kudrum" in local language. The bright red petal of the fruit is used for chutney which is sweet and sour in taste.

In Satpuda Pradesh (near Maharashtra/Gujarat MP border), roselle is called khate fule by local tribal language. The khate fule leaves are mixed with green chillies, salt, some garlic to prepare a chutney and bhaji which is served with jowar (sorghum) or bajra (millet) made bakho (a flat bread). This is eaten by tribals as breakfast to start their day. A dry dish or sukhi bajji is prepared with khate fule leaves.

In Andhra cuisine, roselle is called gongura and is extensively used. The leaves are steamed with lentils and cooked with dal. Another unique dish is prepared by mixing fried leaves with spices and made into a gongura pacchadi, the most famous dish of Andhra and Telangana often described as king of all Andhra foods.
In Manipuri, it is called Sougri and it is used as a vegetables. It is generally cooked without oil by boiling with some other herbs and dried fish and is a favorite of the Manipuri people. Almost every household has this plant in their homes.

In Burmese cuisine, called chin baung ywet (lit. sour leaf), the roselle is widely used and considered affordable. It is perhaps the most widely eaten and popular vegetable in Myanmar. The leaves are fried with garlic, dried or fresh prawns and green chili or cooked with fish. A light soup made from roselle leaves and dried prawn stock is also a popular dish.

Among the Paites tribe of the Manipur Hibiscus sabdariffa and Hibiscus cannabinus locally known as anthuk are cooked along with chicken, fish, crab or pork or any meat, and cooked as a soup as one of their traditional cuisines.
In the Garo Hills of Meghalaya, it is known as galda and is consumed boiled with pork, chicken or fish. After monsoon, the leaves are dried and crushed into powder, then stored for cooking during winter in a rice powder stew, known as galda gisi pura. In the Khasi Hills of Meghalaya, the plant is locally known as jajew, and the leaves are used in local cuisine, cooked with both dried and fresh fish. The Bodos and other indigenous Assamese communities of north east India cook its leaves with fish, shrimp or pork along with boiling it as vegetables which is much relished. Sometimes they add native lye called karwi or khar to bring down its tartness and add flavour.

In the Philippines, the leaves and flowers are used to add sourness to the chicken dish tinola (chicken stew).

In Vietnam, the young leaves, stems and fruits are used for cooking soups with fish or eel.

In Mali, the dried and ground leaves, also called djissima, are commonly used in Songhaï cuisine, in the regions of Timbuktu, Gao and their surroundings. It is the main ingredient in at least two dishes, one called djissima-gounday, where rice is slowly cooked in a broth containing the leaves and lamb, and the other dish is called djissima-mafé, where the leaves are cooked in a tomato sauce, also including lamb. Note that djissima-gounday is also considered an affordable dish.

In Namibia, it is called mutete, and it is consumed by people from the Kavango region in northeastern Namibia.

In the central African nations of Congo-Kinshasa, Congo-Brazzaville and Gabon the leaves are referred to as oseille, and are used puréed, or in a sauce, often with fish and/or aubergines.

Beverage

In the Caribbean, a drink is made from the roselle fruit (the calyces with the seed pods removed). It is prepared by boiling fresh, frozen or dried roselle fruit in water for 8 to 10 minutes (or until the water turns red), then adding sugar. Bay leaves and cloves may also be added during boiling. It is often served chilled. This is done in St. Vincent and the Grenadines, Trinidad and Tobago, Guyana, Antigua, Barbados, Belize, St. Lucia, Dominica, Grenada, Jamaica, the US Virgin Islands and St. Kitts and Nevis where the plant or fruit is called sorrel. The drink is one of several inexpensive beverages (aguas frescas) commonly consumed in Mexico and Central America; they are typically made from fresh fruits, juices or extracts. In Mexican restaurants in the US, the beverage is sometimes known simply as Jamaica ( HAH-MY-CAH). It is very popular in Trinidad and Tobago especially as a seasonal drink at Christmas where cinnamon, cloves and bay leaves are preferred to ginger. It is also popular in Jamaica, usually flavored with rum.

In Ghana, Mali, Mauritania, Senegal, The Gambia, Burkina Faso, Ivory Coast and Benin calyces are used to prepare cold, sweet drinks popular in social events, often mixed with mint leaves, dissolved menthol candy, and/or fruit flavors.

The Sudanese "Karkade" (كركديه) is a cold drink made by soaking the dried Karkade calyces in cold water overnight in a refrigerator with sugar and some lemon or lime juice added. It is then consumed with or without ice cubes after the flowers have been strained. In Lebanon, toasted pine nuts are sometimes added.

Roselle is used in Nigeria to make a refreshing drink known as Zobo and natural fruit juices of pineapple and watermelon are added. Ginger is also sometimes added to the refreshing drink.

With the advent in the U.S. of interest in south-of-the-border cuisine, the calyces are sold in bags usually labeled "flor de Jamaica" and have long been available in health food stores in the U.S. for making tea. In addition to being a popular homemade drink, Jarritos, a popular brand of Mexican soft drinks, makes a flor de Jamaica flavored carbonated beverage. Imported Jarritos can be readily found in the U.S.

In the US, a beverage known as hibiscus cooler is made from the tea, a sweetener, and sometimes juice of apple, grape or lemon. The beverage is sold by some juice companies. Beverages made from the roselle fruit are often consumed by African-Americans at social or familial gatherings, including Juneteenth, a celebration of the emancipation of slaves. The red drink is popular in this culture, as it is an acknowledgement to ancestral West African and African American culture.

In the UK, the dried calyces and ready-made sorrel syrup are widely and cheaply available in Caribbean and Asian grocers. The fresh calyces are imported mainly during December and January to make Christmas and New Year infusions, which are often made into cocktails with rum. They are very perishable, rapidly developing fungal rot, and need to be used soon after purchase — unlike the dried product, which has a long shelf-life.

In Africa, especially the Sahel, roselle is commonly used to make a sugary herbal tea that is sold on the street. The dried flowers can be found in every market. Roselle tea is quite common in Italy where it spread during the first decades of the 20th century as a typical product of the Italian colonies. The Carib Brewery, a Trinidad and Tobago brewery, produces a 'Shandy Sorrel' in which the tea is combined with beer.

In Thailand, roselle is generally drunk as a cool drink, and it can be made into a wine.

Hibiscus flowers are commonly found in commercial herbal teas, especially teas advertised as berry-flavoured, as they give a bright red colouring to the drink.

Roselle flowers are sold as wild hibiscus flowers in syrup in Australia as a gourmet product. Recipes include filling them with goats cheese; serving them on baguette slices baked with brie; and placing one plus a little syrup in a champagne flute before adding the champagne — the bubbles cause the flower to open.

In Dodoma, Tanzania the Roselle juice is brewed to make Roselle wine famous by the name of choya.

Jam and preserves

In Nigeria, roselle jam has been made since colonial times and is still sold regularly at community fetes and charity stalls. It is similar in flavour to plum jam, although more acidic. It differs from other jams in that the pectin is obtained from boiling the interior buds of the roselle flowers. It is thus possible to make rosella jam with nothing but roselle buds and sugar.

In Burma, the buds of the roselle are made into 'preserved fruits' or jams. Depending on the method and the preference, the seeds are removed or included. The jams, made from roselle buds and sugar, are red and tangy.

In India, Roselle is commonly made into a type of pickle.

"Sorrel jelly" is manufactured in Trinidad.

Roselle jam is made in Queensland, Australia as a home-made or speciality product sold at fetes and other community events.

Herbal medicine (high blood pressure)
A 2021 meta-analysis conducted by the Cochrane hypertension group concluded that currently the evidence is insufficient to establish if roselle, when compared to placebo, is effective in managing or lowering blood pressure in people with hypertension.  An older meta-survey (2015) in the Journal of Hypertension suggests a typical reduction in blood pressure of around 7.5/3.5 units (systolic/diastolic).  Both cite the need for additional well designed studies.

Production

China and Thailand are the largest producers and control much of the world supply. The world's best roselle comes from Sudan and Nigeria, b. Mexico, Egypt, Senegal, Tanzania, Mali and Jamaica are also important suppliers but production is mostly used domestically.

In the Indian subcontinent (especially in the Ganges Delta region), roselle is cultivated for vegetable fibres. Roselle is called meśta (or meshta, the ś indicating an sh sound) in the region. Most of its fibres are locally consumed. However, the fibre (as well as cuttings or butts) from the roselle plant has great demand in natural fibre using industries.

Roselle is a relatively new crop to create an industry in Malaysia. It was introduced in the early 1990s and its commercial planting was first promoted in 1993 by the Department of Agriculture in Terengganu. The planted area is now less than  annually, planted with two main varieties. Terengganu state used to be the first and the largest producer, but now the production has spread more to other states. Despite the dwindling hectarage over the past decade or so, roselle is becoming increasingly known to the general population as an important pro-health drink. To a small extent, the calyces are also processed into sweet pickle, jelly and jam.

Crop research

In the initial years, limited research work was conducted by University Malaya and Malaysian Agricultural Research and Development Institute (MARDI). Research work at Universiti Kebangsaan Malaysia (UKM) was initiated in 1999. In many respects, the amount of research work is considered meagre in supporting a growing roselle industry in Malaysia.

Crop genetic resources and improvement

Genetic variation is important for plant breeders to increase crop productivity. Being an introduced species in Malaysia, there is a very limited number of germplasm accessions available for breeding.

UKM maintains a working germplasm collection and conducts agronomic research and crop improvement.

Mutation breeding

Conventional hybridization is difficult to carry out in roselle due to its cleistogamous nature of reproduction. Because of this, a mutation breeding programme was initiated to generate new genetic variability. The use of induced mutations for its improvement was initiated in 1999 in cooperation with MINT (now called Malaysian Nuclear Agency) and has produced some promising breeding lines. Roselle is a tetraploid species; thus, segregating populations require longer time to achieve fixation as compared to diploid species. In April 2009, UKM launched three new varieties named UKMR-1, UKMR-2 and UKMR-3. These new varieties were developed using Arab as the parent variety in a mutation breeding programme which started in 2006.

Natural outcrossing under local conditions

A study was conducted to estimate the amount of outcrossing under local conditions in Malaysia. It was found that outcrossing occurred at a very low rate of about 0.02%. However, this rate is much lower in comparison to estimates of natural cross-pollination of between 0.20% and 0.68% as reported in Jamaica.

Phytochemicals
The Hibiscus leaves are a good source of polyphenolic compounds. The major identified compounds include neochlorogenic acid, chlorogenic acid, cryptochlorogenic acid, caffeoylshikimic acid and flavonoid compounds such as quercetin, kaempferol and their derivatives. The flowers are rich in anthocyanins, as well as protocatechuic acid. The dried calyces contain the flavonoids gossypetin, hibiscetine and sabdaretine. The major pigment is not daphniphylline. Small amounts of myrtillin (delphinidin 3-monoglucoside), chrysanthenin (cyanidin 3-monoglucoside), and delphinidin are present. Roselle seeds are a good source of lipid-soluble antioxidants, particularly gamma-tocopherol.

Gallery

Footnotes

Further reading

External links
 
 
 Roselle on Encyclopædia Britannica
 
 
 Jus de Bissap ("Roselle juice")

Hibiscus
Leaf vegetables
Fiber plants
Herbal tea
Medicinal plants
Tropical agriculture
Flora of Africa
Plants described in 1753
Flora without expected TNC conservation status